Gubeundari Station is a subway station on Seoul Subway Line 5 in Gangdong-gu, Seoul.

Overview 
The name of Gubeundari literally means Bent Bridge. It is named after the previous name of Gokgyo-ri (곡교리), a village near Cheonho-dong in the era of Joseon Dynasty and now located in Myeongil-dong. Nearby Gubeundari Station, housing complexes such as Jugong Complex 9, Myeongil Hyundai, Myeongil LG, Kumho, Dasung, Samick Garden and Samick Park Apartments are located, as well as Daemyeong Elementary School, Cheonho and Sinmyeong Middle School, Myungsung Presbyterian Church, Gil-dong Catholic Church, Gangdong Community Center, Dongseoul Market and Gandong Branch of the nationwide mega mart Homeplus.

Station layout

References 

Railway stations opened in 1995
Seoul Metropolitan Subway stations
Metro stations in Gangdong District